Aminul Haque (4 April 1931 – 13 July 1995) was a Bangladeshi lawyer. He server as the Attorney General of Bangladesh. He was married to Farida Akhter (d. 2007), a faculty member at Jagannath University. He was the eldest brother of Seargent Zahurul Haq who was accused in the Agartala Conspiracy Case and killed by the Pakistan military at Dhaka Cantonment in 1969.

Career 
Haque was one of the founding members of Ain-O-Salish Kendra, a non-government, civil rights and legal aid organization in Bangladesh.

References 

1931 births
1995 deaths
People from Noakhali District
Attorneys General of Bangladesh
20th-century Bangladeshi lawyers